The 1920–21 Hamilton Tigers season was the first season of play for the new Hamilton Tigers team in the National Hockey League (NHL). The Tigers finished in last place in both halves of the season and did not qualify for the playoffs. The team previously had played in Quebec City, where they were known as the Quebec Bulldogs, but had been sold to Hamilton interests in 1920. Joe Malone led the team in scoring, with 28 goals in 20 games.

Offseason
The NHL transferred the Quebec franchise to Hamilton, where it was named the Tigers, a nickname used by a multitude of sports teams in the city. Contemporary newspaper coverage often referred to the senior team of the same name in the OHA as the "Tigers", while the NHL team would either be nameless or simply referred to as "professionals".

Regular season

Noting that the Quebec Athletics finished in last place in 1919–20, the league encouraged the other teams to provide players to Hamilton to improve the team's competitiveness. Toronto provided Babe Dye but recalled Dye after the first game and loaned Mickey Roach. Montreal provided Billy Coutu in exchange for keeping Harry Mummery. Ottawa did not provide any players willingly. Sprague Cleghorn and Harry Broadbent were eventually ordered by the league to report to Hamilton, but neither did. Cleghorn played some games with Toronto before returning to Ottawa.

Joe Malone missed the start of the season due to business commitments keeping him in Quebec. He joined the team in January 1921, having missed four games. He scored 28 goals in 20 games for the Tigers to place fourth in the league in goal-scoring. However, the team won only three games in each half of the schedule to finish last, with a record of 6 wins and 18 losses.

Final standings

Record vs. opponents

Playoffs
The Tigers did not qualify for the playoffs.

Schedule and results

Player statistics

Note: Pos = Position; GP = Games played; G = Goals; A = Assists; Pts = Points; PIM = Penalty minutes      MIN = Minutes played; W = Wins; L = Losses; T = Ties; GA = Goals-against; GAA = Goals-against average; SO = Shutouts;

Transactions

Trades

Source:

See also
 1920–21 NHL season

References

Bibliography

 
 

Hamilton Tigers
Hamilton
Hamilton Tigers (ice hockey) seasons